Rafael Ribeiro may refer to:
 Rafael Ribeiro (athlete)
 Rafael Ribeiro (footballer)